This is a list of player transfers involving RFU Championship teams before or during the 2018–19 season. The list is of deals that are confirmed and are either from or to a rugby union team in the Championship during the 2017–18 season. It is not unknown for confirmed deals to be cancelled at a later date. Bristol Bears won promotion to the Aviva Premiership from the 2018–19 season, whilst London Irish were relegated to the RFU Championship from the 2018–19 season. Coventry won promotion to the RFU Championship from the 2018–19 season, whilst Rotherham Titans are relegated to National League 1.

Bedford Blues

Players In
 Charlie Clare from  Northampton Saints
 Hayden King from  Blackheath
 Ollie Curry from  Ealing Trailfinders
 Ed Coulson from  Hartpury College
 Huw Worthington from  RGC 1404
 Ryan Hutler from  Bishop's Strotford
 Lewis Robling from  Ealing Trailfinders
 Mark Flanagan from  Saracens
 Pat Tapley from  Warringah
 Jamie Elliott from  Northampton Saints
 Harry Davies from  Bath

Players Out
 Tom Lindsay to  Bristol Bears
 George Edgson to  Ealing Trailfinders
 Howard Packman to  Ealing Trailfinders
 Jordan Burns to  Ealing Trailfinders
 Paul Tupai retired
 Michael Le Bourgeois to  Wasps
 Ollie Dodge retired
 Ben Adams to  Coventry
 Ban Kelland to  Hartpury College
 Dave Spelman to  Richmond
 Elliot Clement-Hill to  Blackheath
 Dan Lewis to  Coventry
 Jamie Elliot to  Zebre

Cornish Pirates

Players In
 Robin Wedlake from  Plymouth Albion
 Tyler Gendall from  Bristol Bears
 Javier Rojas from  Viadana
 Callum Patterson from  Ulster
 Alex Schwarz from  RGC 1404
 Dan Frost from  Taunton
 Maliq Holden from  Hartpury College
 Jake Ashby from  Burys St Edmunds
 Danny Cutmore from  Saracens
 Rory Parata from  Zebre
 Nodar Tcheishvili from  Chambéry
 Jordan Payne from  NEC Green Rockets
 Tom Concu from  Caldy

Players Out
 Paul Andrew retired
 Laurence May to  Ealing Trailfinders
 Nicolas De Battista to  Zebre
 Toby May retired
 Mike Pope retired
 Nicolas Coronel to  Lazio
 Bar Bartlett retired
 Alex Cheesman retired

Coventry

Players In
 Charlie Beech from  Yorkshire Carnegie
 James Gibbons from  Ealing Trailfinders
 Andrew Bulumakau from  Doncaster Knights
 Junior Bulumakau from  Doncaster Knights
 Jack Ram from  Doncaster Knights
 Jake Sharp from  London Scottish
 Adam Peters from  Rotherham Titans
 David Halaifonua from  Gloucester
 Ben Nutley from  Northampton Saints
 Darren Dawidiuk from  London Irish
 Tim Bitirim from  Loughborough Students RUFC
 Tom Kessell from  Northampton Saints
 Ben Adams from  Bedford Blues
 Daniel Faleafa from  Colomiers
 Rob Povey from  Bedford Athletic
 Dan Lewis from  Bedford Blues
 Alex Woolford from  Northampton Saints
 Biyi Alo from  Worcester Warriors

Players Out
 Jimmy Litchfield to  London Scottish
 Luke Narraway retired
 Ravai Fatiaki to  Birmingham Moseley

Doncaster Knights

Players In
 Toby Williams from  Rotherham Titans
 Tom Calladine from  Rotherham Titans
 Robin Hislop from  Ayr
 Steve McColl from  Yorkshire Carnegie
 Willie Ryan from  Ealing Trailfinders
 Elliott Creed from  Gloucester
 Nick Civetta from  Newcastle Falcons
 Henry Seniloli from  Timișoara Saracens
 Cameron Cowell from  Newcastle Falcons (season-long loan)
 Kurt Morath from  Utah Warriors
 Lasha Lomidze from  Aurillac

Players Out
 Aaron Carpenter retired
 Michael Heaney to  Worcester Warriors
 Lesley Klim to  Ospreys
 Andrew Bulumakau to  Coventry
 Junior Bulumakau to  Coventry
 Jack Ram to  Coventry
 Adam Batt to  Jersey Reds
 Jack Bergmanas to  Rotherham Titans

Ealing Trailfinders

Players In
 Ollie Stedman from  Yorkshire Carnegie
 Sam Dickinson from  Northampton Saints
 Jack O'Connell from  Bristol Bears
 Jordan Onojaife from  Northampton Saints
 Laurence May from  Cornish Pirates
 Ben Betts from  Leicester Tigers
 Sam Olver from  Worcester Warriors
 Tom Denton from  Gloucester
 George Edgson from  Bedford Blues
 Howard Packman from  Bedford Blues
 Guy Armitage from  Wasps
 Harry Sloan from  Harlequins
 Ben West from  Yorkshire Carnegie
 Matt Beesley from  Northampton Saints
 Ryan Foley from  Grasse
 David Johnston from  Munster
 Jordan Burns from  Bedford Blues
 Elliot Millar-Mills from  Edinburgh
 Andrew Durutalo from  Worcester Warriors
 Craig Willis from  Newcastle Falcons
 Ben Williams from  Cardiff Metropolitan University
 George Simpson from  Cardiff Metropolitan University
 Ben Landry from  Glendale Raptors
 Jordy Reid from  Melbourne Rebels
 Pat Howard from  Dragons
 Jake Ellwood from  Darlington Mowden Park
 George Davis from  Loughborough Students RUFC
 Segundo Tuculet from  Narbonne
 Alex Lundberg from  Wasps
 Max Davies from  Newcastle Falcons
 Rohan O'Regan from  Sydney University
 Jordan Els from  Sharks

Players Out
 Will Davis to  Northampton Saints
 Lewis Thiede to  Bristol Bears
 Piers O'Conor to  Bristol Bears
 Luke Daniels to  Bristol Bears
 Sam Rodman to  Jersey Reds
 Aaron Penberthy to  Jersey Reds
 Shane O'Leary to  Nottingham
 James Gibbons to  Coventry
 Ollie Curry to  Bedford Blues
 Mark Bright to  London Scottish
 Llewelyn Jones to  Nottingham
 Rhys Lawrence to  Dragons
 Barney Maddison to  London Irish
 Lewis Robling to  Bedford Blues
 Willie Ryan to  Doncaster Knights
 Morgan Allen to  Cardiff
 Miles Mantella to  London Scottish
 Daniel Temm to  Yorkshire Carnegie
 Djustice Sears-Duru to  Ontario Blues
 Arthur Ellis to  Rosslyn Park
 Glen Townson retired
 Joe Munro to  Rosslyn Park
 Rory Clegg released
 James Hallam released

Hartpury College

Players In
 Luke Cozens from  Rouen
 Richard Bolt from  Rouen
 Jake Henry from  Rotherham Titans
 Ben Foley from  Rotherham Titans
 Simon Linsell from  University of Exeter
 Jordan Liney from  Bristol Bears
 Will Hopwood from  Fylde
 Ollie Walker from  Shelford
 Ban Kelland from  Bedford Blues
 Akapusi Qera from  Agen

Players Out
 James Williams to  Birmingham Moseley
 Mike Daniels to  Nottingham
 Ed Coulson to  Bedford Blues
 Maliq Holden to  Cornish Pirates
 George Boulton to  Cinderford
 Jacob Perry to  London Scottish
 Alex Ducker to  Camborne
 BJ Edwards to  Gungahlin Eagles
 Tom Heard to  Cinderford
 Ben So'oalo Chan to  Cinderford
 Joe Dancer to  Chinnor
 Darrell Dyer to  Carcasonne

Jersey Reds

Players In
 Aaron Penberthy from  Ealing Trailfinders
 Sam Rodman from  Ealing Trailfinders
 Brett Herron from  Ulster
 Janco Venter from  Stellenbosch University
 Graham Geldenhuys from  Sharks
 Hilton Mudariki from  University of Johannesburg
 Leroy Van Dam from  Valley RFC
 Harry Morley from  Cambridge
 Kyle Hatherell from  Marr
 Koch Marx from  Golden Lions
 Jack Stapley from  Loughborough Students RUFC
 James Newey from  Bristol Bears
 Will Homer from  Bath
 Charlie Beckett from  Gloucester
 Charlie Maddison from  Rotherham Titans
 Cameron Holenstein from  Harlequins
 Adam Batt from  Doncaster Knights

Players Out
 Scott van Breda to  Worcester Warriors
 Jake Armstrong to  Bristol Bears
 Jake Woolmore to  Bristol Bears
 Tom Pincus to  Bristol Bears
 James Voss to  Leicester Tigers
 Brendan Cope to  Yorkshire Carnegie
 Kieran Hardy to  Scarlets
 Matt Rogerson to  London Irish
 Jared Saunders to  London Scottish
 Uili Kolo'ofai to  Paspa Pesaro
 Jordan Brodley to  London Scottish
 Ellis Abrahams to  Rotherham Titans
 Seb Nagle-Taylor to  Rotherham Titans
 Tom Quarrie to  Marmande
 Oliver Bryant to  CR El Salvador

London Irish

Players In
 Stephen Myler from  Northampton Saints
 Tom Stephenson from  Northampton Saints
 Barney Maddison from  Ealing Trailfinders
 Matt Rogerson from  Jersey Reds
 Bryce Campbell from  Glendale Raptors
 Motu Matu'u from  Gloucester
 Pat Cilliers from  Leicester Tigers
 Sam Twomey from  Harlequins
 TJ Ioane from  Sale Sharks
 Brendan Macken from  Wasps
 Albert Tuisue from  Fijian Drua
 Alivereti Veitokani from  Fijian Drua

Players Out
 Alex Lewington to  Saracens
 Ben Franks to  Northampton Saints
 David Paice retired
 Tom Woolstencroft to  Saracens
 Joe Cokanasiga to  Bath
 Darren Dawidiuk to  Coventry
 Piet van Zyl to  Stade Francais
 Johnny Williams to  Newcastle Falcons
 Arno Botha to  Munster
 Richard Palframan to  London Scottish
 Senitiki Nayalo to  Edinburgh
 Todd Gleave to  Gloucester
 James Marshall to  Hurricanes
 Tom Smallbone to  London Scottish
 Lasha Lomidze to  Aurillac 
 Josh Basham to  Durham University
 Petrus du Plessis to  Glasgow Warriors
 Will Lloyd released
 Asaeli Tikoirotuma released

London Scottish

Players In
 Mark Bright from  Ealing Trailfinders
 Rory Jennings from  Bath
 Jimmy Litchfield from  Coventry
 Luke Frost from  Loughborough Students RUFC
 Ollie Adams from  Loughborough Students RUFC
 Grayson Hart from  Worcester Warriors
 Jared Saunders from  Jersey Reds
 Richie Vernon from  Glasgow Warriors
 Richard Palframan from  London Irish
 Theo Vukasinovic from  Loughborough Students RUFC
 Jacob Perry from  Hartpury College
 Billy Harding from  Esher
 Byron Hodge from  Rotherham Titans
 Jordan Brodley from  Jersey Reds
 Lewis Wynne from  Glasgow Warriors (season-long loan)
 Miles Mantella from  Ealing Trailfinders
 Tom Smallbone from  London Irish
 Craig Duncan from  University of Bath
 Henari Veratau from  Bourgoin

Players Out
 Isaac Miller to  Worcester Warriors
 Jake Sharp to  Coventry
 Ewan McQuillin to  Yorkshire Carnegie
 Joe Atkinson to  Wasps
 Ross Neal to  Wasps
 Derrick Appiah to  Benetton
 Dom McGeekie to  Old Elthamians
 Basil Strang to  Esher
 Max Berry to  Esher
 Ed Milne to  Richmond
 Nick Scott from  Richmond
 Craig Holland to  Chinnor

Nottingham

Players In
 Luke Cole from  Rotherham Titans
 Shane O'Leary from  Ealing Trailfinders
 Llewelyn Jones from  Ealing Trailfinders
 Will Owen from  Wasps
 Mike Daniels from  Hartpury College
 Oisin Heffernan from  Leinster
 Luke Peters from  Rotherham Titans
 Cam Dolan from  San Diego Legion

Players Out
 Tiff Eden to  Bristol Bears
 Matt Everard retired
 Josh Skelcey to  Plymouth Albion
 Ben Morris to  Wasps
 Jimmy Stevens to  Leicester Tigers
 Oliver Evans to  Richmond
 Viliami Hakalo to  Saracens

Richmond

Players In
 Jack Wallace from  Bristol Bears
 Lewis Dennett from  Ebbw Vale
 Sam Edgerley from  Oxford University
 Oliver Evans from  Nottingham
 Rupert Freestone from  Plymouth Albion
 Ed Milne from  London Scottish
 Nick Scott from  London Scottish
 Dave Spelman from  Bedford Blues

Players Out

Yorkshire Carnegie

Players In
 Brendan Cope from  Jersey Reds
 Jean-Baptiste Bruzulier from  Nevers
 Jake Ilnicki from  Newcastle Falcons
 Ewan McQuillin from  London Scottish
 Rowan Jenkins from  Ospreys
 Andrew Foster from  Rotherham Titans
 Daniel Temm from  Ealing Trailfinders
 Kieran Frost from  Wharfedale
 Dan Moor from  Oxford University
 Antonio Kiri Kiri from  Manawatu
 Jade Te Rure from  Manawatu
 Cian Romaine from  North Harbour
 Nic Mayhew from  Brumbies
 Fa'atiga Lemalu from  Auckland
 Elijah Niko from  Beziers

Players Out
 Michael Cusack retired
 Ollie Stedman to  Ealing Trailfinders
 Charlie Beech to  Coventry
 Ben West to  Ealing Trailfinders
 Steve McColl to  Doncaster Knights
 Alex Davies to  Bath

See also
List of 2018–19 Premiership Rugby transfers
List of 2018–19 Pro14 transfers
List of 2018–19 Super Rugby transfers
List of 2018–19 Top 14 transfers
List of 2018–19 Major League Rugby transfers

References

2018-19
2018–19 RFU Championship